Sidkeong (also Sridkyong or Srid-kyong) is a given name. Notable people with the name include:

Sidkeong Namgyal (1819–1874), king of Sikkim 1863–1874
Sidkeong Tulku Namgyal (1879–1914), Chogyal of Sikkim in 1914